Suranjan Das (22 February 1920 – 10 January 1970) was a pilot in the Indian Air Force. He joined the Royal Indian Air Force during the Second World War and was among the first pilots to be sent to Empire Test Pilots School to a test pilot for the Indian Air Force. He was a group captain. He commanded the Halwara Air Force Station Base between 1967 and 1969 and was the director of the Aircraft & Armament Testing Group of the Indian Air Force from 1969 until his death. He was awarded the Padma Vibhushan posthumously in 1970. He was the son of Sudhi Ranjan Das He died in an air crash while test flying a HAL HF-24 prototype.

The entire 4.1-km stretch of the road connecting Old Madras Road and Old Airport Road, Bangalore, is named Suranjan Das Road after Group Captain Suranjan Das.

References

1920 births
1970 deaths
Indian Air Force officers
Indian aviators
Indian test pilots
Recipients of the Padma Vibhushan in civil service
Das family of Telirbagh